Bengali mythology in a literal sense has been a derivative of Vedic mythology. It can refer to the historical legends and folk tales of West Bengal and Bangladesh. Given the historical Hindu and Buddhist presence in the region, characters from Vedic and Hindu mythology are present within Bengali literature. Later Islamic settlement has introduced legendary traits that ultimately draw from Middle Eastern inspirations. Such an example of the Vedic and Islamic legend transaction would be the progenitor of Bengalis known as Bonga, Hindu literature credits him as an ancient Hindu Prince Vanga, adopted son of King Vali. Muslim accounts however refer him as Bong, son of Hind who was the grandson of Prince.

See also 
Chaitanya

References

Further reading

Bengali culture
Hindu mythology